Local elections were held in Pasay on May 14, 2001, within the Philippine general election. The voters elected for the elective local posts in the city: the mayor, vice mayor, the representative for the lone district, and the councilors, six of them in the two districts of the city.

Background 
Mayor Wenceslao Trinidad sought his first full term as mayor of the city. He was challenged by Vice Mayor Gregorio "Greg" Alcera, and former security aide of the late Mayor Pablo Cuneta, retired police Ricardo "Ding" Santos.

Vice Mayor Gregorio "Greg" Alcera ran as Mayor. His party chosen Danilo "Danny" Roque, a businessman. Roque was challenged by Second District Councilor Antonino "Tony" Calixto, and Joven "Jojie" Claudio, son of former Mayor Jovito Claudio.

Representative Rolando "Ding" Briones ran for second term. He was challenged by Second District Councilor Ma. Consuelo "Connie" Dy, former Senator Freddie Webb, who became city's councilor from 1971 up to 1978, First District Councilor Panfilo "Justo" Justo, former DOT Sec. Mina Gabor, and other candidates.

Candidates

Team Trinidad Calixto Briones

Team Alcera Roque Dy

Team Kaibigan

Results 
Names written in bold-Italic are the re-elected incumbents while in italic are incumbents lost in elections.

For Representative 
Rep. Rolando "Ding" Briones was defeated by Second District Councilor Ma. Consuelo "Connie" Dy.

For Mayor 
Mayor Wenceslao "Peewee" Trinidad defeated Vice Mayor Gregorio "Greg" Alcera.

For Vice Mayor 
First District Councilor Antonino Calixto was elected.

For Councilors

First District
Three of the six incumbents were re-elected. Three-termer councilor Romulo Cabrera was replaced by his son Jonathan "RJ" Cabrera, who placed 5th. Two-termer councilor Antonino "Tony" Calixto ran and won as vice mayor. Three-termer councilor Panfilo "Justo" Justo ran as representative but lost to First District Councilor Ma. Consuelo "Connie" Dy. 

Other newly-elected councilors were Ma. Luisa "Bing" Petallo, who placed 2nd and Marlon Pesebre, who placed 6th.

|-bgcolor=black
|colspan=5|

Second District
Four of the six incumbents were re-elected. Councilor Ma. Consuelo "Connie" Dy ran as representative and won. 

Pedro "Pete" Tiamzon failed to win for re-election, placing 9th.

Newly-elected councilors were Edita "Edith" Vergel de Dios and Arnel Regino "Moti" Arceo, who happened to be both former councilors successfully made a comeback in the city council.

|-bgcolor=black
|colspan=5|

References

External links

2001 Philippine local elections
Elections in Pasay